Cathy Glass  may refer to:
 Katherine Glass, American actress
 Cathy Glass (author), British writer